Smooth & Legit is the debut album by Smooth, known as MC Smooth at the time. It was released on April 27, 1990, by independent label Crush Music and produced by her brother Chris Stokes and former N.W.A member, Arabian Prince. The album reached No. 72 on the Billboard Top R&B Albums chart.

Track listing
"Smooth & Legit"- 4:19 
"Intro: Vocals"- 0:19 
"You Gotta Be Real"- 4:01 
"Intro: Vocals"- 0:14 
"Who's Smooth the M.C."- 3:15 
"Take It from the Top"- 3:39 
"24/7"- 2:45 
"Intro: Vocals"- 0:17 
"The Dope Man"- 3:45 
"Intro: Vocals"- 0:13 
"I'm an Individual"- 2:27 
"Intro: Vocals"- 0:16 
"Where is the Money"- 4:09 
"Blow Your Whistle"- 4:24 
"You Reap What You Sow"- 3:26 
"Intro: Vocals"- 0:15 
"It Could Have Been You"- 3:24 
"Clap Your Hands"- 3:55 
"You Think You Want Some"- 3:44

1990 debut albums
Smooth (singer) albums